Alindao is a town and sub-prefecture located in the Central African Republic prefecture of Basse-Kotto.  It lies at the junction of the National Route 2 and 22. Alindao had a population of 14,401 as of the 2003 census; and a calculated 2013 population of 15,213. The town is the seat of the Roman Catholic Diocese of Alindao. It has a small airport, Alindao Airport. A Catholic Mission was established at Alindao during French occupation under French Equatorial Africa.

History 

In 1912, the leader of the Banda-Ngbugu people in Alindao, Aju, swore allegiance to the French colonisers. However, he led a local revolt in 1925 and was captured and executed the following year.

In 1927, Norwegian missionary Oscar Cesar Berntz-Lanz established the Elim Mission at Boybinga in the Alindao subprefecture. It was among the first Protestant missions in the colony and included a small dispensary and a school. When World War II broke out in 1939, the family relocated to South Africa.

On 5 January 2013 Séléka rebels took control of Alindao. On 9 May 2017 it was attacked by Anti-balaka which was repelled by Union for Peace in the Central African Republic. On 15 November 2018 at least 112 people were killed and 27 injured in UPC and Anti-balaka attacks on Alindao refugee camp. On 18 March 2021 Alindao was recaptured by government forces supported by Russian paramilitary forces.

Economy
The economy is based on food crops and cash crops (mainly coffee), and the processing of agricultural products. Fishing, hunting, trade and craft activities are also local employment practices but the majority live in poverty. The locals reside in houses with huge thatched roofs and mud walls painted in colored clay.

Towns and villages

 Abouma
 Akpia
 Alepa
 Alindao
 Amoko
 Bada [5°'0"N 21°8'0"E]
 Bada [4°50'0"N 21°20'0"E]
 Bada [4°47'0"N 21°12'0"E]
 Badji
 Balada
 Banan
 Banda [5°20'0"N 21°'0"E]
 Banda [5°'0"N 21°9'0"E]
 Banda [4°52'0"N 21°20'0"E]
 Banda [4°'0"N 21°'0"E]
 Bangba
 Belogba
 Bitou
 Bokoula
 Bondo
 Borota
 Boroudou
 Boulouvou
 Bourou
 Boybangoro
 Boykette
 Congo
 Dabizi
 Dahou
 Ddebo
 Diogo
 Djongo
 Doko
 Drekapou
 Gambito [4°50'0"N 21°17'0"E]
 Gambito [4°47'0"N 21°2'0"E]
 Gbada
 Gbadou
 Gbana
 Gbileba
 Gboundou
 Goffo
 Gongo
 Gopala
 Gouada
 Gouadji
 Gouakiri [5°10'0"N 21°18'0"E]
 Gouakiri [5°9'0"N 21°17'0"E]
 Gouamatou
 Gounda
 Goussa
 Goussou [5°15'0"N 21°'0"E]
 Goussou [4°55'0"N 21°20'0"E]
 Govo
 Gowe
 Goyo
 Guela
 Gueloumanda
 Kabou
 Kadja
 Kalaye
 Kaoua
 Kodo
 Kola
 Kologbo
 Kolomboyo
 Kongbo
 Kongo
 Kouledo
 Koumba
 Kpakpa
 Laodeka
 Liou
 Loe
 Mazogbo
 Mbele
 Mbiloba
 Mede
 Mia
 Moko
 Moro
 Ndjala
 Ngalia
 Ngapo
 Ngara
 Ngbindjou
 Ngoula
 Ngoule
 Ngrihou
 Nougolo
 Oroko
 Ouaga [5°37'0"N 21°'0"E]
 Ouaga [5°36'0"N 21°'0"E]
 Ouama
 Ouate
 Ouenguele
 Ouli
 Pagui
 Pandoko
 Pigala
 Poudjio
 Rokouzou
 Sounda
 Tagbale
 Tagoua
 Tchinda
 Tchingoto
 Teou
 Togbo
 Tomba
 Yota
 Youkou
 Zougao
 Zoulouma

Notable people
Emmanuel Dongala (1941-) -one of the Congo's greatest poets

References

External links
Maplandia

Sub-prefectures of the Central African Republic
Populated places in Basse-Kotto